Wethersfield High School is a high school in Wethersfield, Connecticut, United States.

Awards
Wethersfield High School was recognized as a National Blue Ribbon School in 1996.
The Wethersfield High School Design Engineering Team placed first nationally in the AbilityOne Design Challenge in  2013 and 2014.
Wethersfield High School's Boys varsity soccer has won 16 state championships (1948, 1949, 1954, 1955, 1957, 1968, 1975, 1982, 1984, 1991, 1999, 2000, 2002, 2004, 2008, 2021).

Structure
Wethersfield High School originally opened in 1952, with several small renovations taking place in 1957, 1970, and 1993. The current school building standing on the property is a multi-story brick modern-style structure. By the 2010s the school did not meet current educational curriculum requirements, did not address current safety standards, and was not code compliant for individuals with disabilities. The aging building was evaluated and a referendum was passed for a "Renovate As New" construction plan. The renovation started in October 2013 with a planned completion date of April 2017. It was fully completed by January 2017.

Notable alumni 

 Ryan Costello, professional baseball player
 Tony DiCicco - professional goaltender and United States women's national soccer team coach; graduated in 1968 
 Betsey Johnson - fashion designer; graduated in 1960
 Mark Linn-Baker - actor; graduated in 1972
 Chris Murphy - U.S Senator
 Tyler Murphy - NFL player with the Miami Dolphins
 Steve Roslonek - children's music performer
 Colin McDonald - professional hockey player
 Jimmy Slayton - USL Soccer Player, All-American, University of Hartford
 Mark Tetto - television personality residing in South Korea

References

External links
 

Wethersfield, Connecticut
Schools in Hartford County, Connecticut
Public high schools in Connecticut